Lee Haney (born November 11, 1959) is an American former IFBB professional bodybuilder. Haney shares the all-time record for most Mr. Olympia titles at eight with Ronnie Coleman and is regarded as one of the greatest bodybuilders to ever grace the stage.

Biography 
Haney grew up in Spartanburg, South Carolina. He is a graduate of Spartanburg Methodist College, where he earned a degree in youth counseling. He married Irish model Shirley Draper Haney in 2003 after dating for three years. They had a son, born in 2003, and a daughter in 2005. The family resides in Atlanta, Georgia. 

President Bill Clinton appointed Haney chairman of the President's Council on Physical Fitness and Sports. A devout born again Christian, Haney has his own program on the Trinity Broadcasting Network called "TotaLee Fit with Lee Haney," where he is usually joined by famous Christian sportsmen, and on occasion his wife. On the show he teaches the importance of both physical and spiritual growth. One of his most famous quotes is that we should "train to stimulate, not annihilate."

Stats 
Height: 
 Off Season Weight: 
 Competition Weight: the lightest  1984 Mr. Olympia and the heaviest  1989 Mr. Olympia
Chest size: 56 in (142 cm)
 Neck size: 
 Arm Size: 
 Waist: 
 Thigh Size: 
 Calf Size:

Bodybuilding titles 

1979 Teen Mr. America
1979 Teen Mr. America Tall, 1st
1982 Junior Nationals Heavyweight & Overall, 1st
1982 Nationals Heavyweight & Overall, 1st
1982 World Amateur Championships Heavyweight, 1st
1983 Grand Prix England, 2nd
1983 Grand Prix Las Vegas, 1st
1983 Grand Prix Sweden, 2nd
1983 Grand Prix Switzerland, 3rd
1983 Night of Champions, 1st
1983 Mr. Olympia, 3rd
1983 World Pro Championships, 3rd
1984 Mr. Olympia, 1st
1985 Mr. Olympia, 1st
1986 Mr. Olympia, 1st
1987 Mr. Olympia, 1st
1987 Grand Prix Germany (II), 1st
1988 Mr. Olympia, 1st
1989 Mr. Olympia, 1st
1990 Mr. Olympia, 1st
1991 Mr. Olympia, 1st

See also
 List of male professional bodybuilders
 List of female professional bodybuilders

References

External links

Lee Haney's website
Lee Haney on Twitter

Lee Haney Gallery

1959 births
Living people
African-American Christians
African-American bodybuilders
American bodybuilders
Christians from Georgia (U.S. state)
Christians from South Carolina
Professional bodybuilders
People from Fairburn, Georgia
Spartanburg Methodist College alumni
21st-century African-American people
20th-century African-American sportspeople